Beijing United Family Hospital and Clinics (BJU, Chinese: 北京和睦家医院) was the first international standard hospital established in China. It opened in 1997 as a joint venture between Chindex International, Inc. and the Chinese Academy of Medical Sciences. Beijing United Family was the first foreign-invested hospital to operate in China. In 2009, the hospital had 50 beds and sees over 2,500 patients every week with its 17 departments and services.

The hospital has imported equipment and modern facilities, and has the capability to diagnose and treat medical problems ranging from minor ailments to severe illness. Their 24-hour emergency and intensive care services are among the most advanced in Beijing.

Beijing United Family was the first hospital in China to receive accreditation from the United States-based, nonprofit, Joint Commission International (JCI). The facilities, quality and standard of care at BJU are on an international standard and are comparable to the best healthcare providers in the United States and Europe.

The hospital is staffed by a team of over 100 doctors from 15 different countries, China, Australia, Belgium, Canada, France, Germany, Italy, Japan, Nepal, Philippines, Singapore, South Korea, Switzerland, the United Kingdom, and the United States. These specialists are supported by a team of English-speaking nurses. BJU has over 500 support workers. In 2010, the hospital opened a new United Family Liangma Clinic outside the main hospital.

Beijing United Family Hospital has sister hospitals in Shanghai, Tianjin, Qingdao, Guangzhou and Ulaanbaatar, Mongolia

Background
Beijing United Family Hospital was started by Roberta Lipson, who earned her MBA from Columbia University in New York City and worked for a few years for a U.S. pharmaceutical company, before moving to Beijing in 1979. Two years later, she partnered with fellow New Yorker Elyse Beth Silverberg to co-found U.S.-China Industrial Exchange, the company that would later change its name to Chindex. In its early years, the company sold not only medical equipment, but a wide variety of other products, ranging from 70-ton mining trucks to geothermal energy equipment to mushroom growing systems.

Steady growth led to a listing on the Nasdaq Exchange in 1993, after which Chindex narrowed its focus to the medical sector alone. Through her years of selling top-flight equipment to hospitals all across China, Lipson also came to understand that new equipment was not the only thing Chinese hospitals needed to improve themselves. 'It became increasingly apparent,' says Lipson, 'that while Chinese hospitals were moving towards an international standard on the hardware front, something was still missing.'

The starkest proof of that came just before the birth of her first child, when Lipson accompanied a pregnant Chinese friend as she delivered at a Beijing hospital. Although it was one of China's premiere obstetrics facilities at the time, the experience left much to be desired. 'Shortly after that, I had the opportunity to return to the United States to have my own child and experience the U.S. approach to labor and delivery, and the vast differences just seemed unfair to me,' Roberta Lipson recalls.

Following that experience, Roberta Lipson and Elyse began exploring ways to bring not only the hardware but also the 'soft' technologies of healthcare to China. They felt that many aspects of international standard healthcare could be brought to China, such as a philosophy of patient-centered care, a service mentality, systems management, and quality control. After examining their options, Roberta and Elyse decided the only way to make it happen was to do it themselves.

They also realized that their many years of selling medical equipment in China - everything from ultrasound to patient monitors to MRI machines—had given Chindex a keen understanding of the nation's healthcare system and an unrivaled network of relationships at all levels of the Chinese medical establishment. And, though tough regulatory restrictions remained on foreign medical service operations in China, they saw an opportunity to leverage their experience and their advantages.

Western-style healthcare in China
Their first inkling of an idea for a Western-style healthcare facility came to them in early 1992, but that only marked the start of a lengthy process that included complex negotiations over approvals for a foreign-invested hospital; design and completion of the building itself; hiring and training of staff; acquisition and installation of equipment; and myriad other details.

No one had ever undertaken such a project before, and it was not until the end of 1997 that Beijing United Family Hospital and Clinics (BJU) opened its doors and treated its first patient. Constituted as a joint venture between Chindex and the China Academy of Medical Sciences, BJU was enthusiastically received as a long-awaited and badly needed alternative to the existing healthcare offerings in China.

'It's a concept that we've proved can work in China and so we plan to bring this model to other Chinese cities,' says Lipson. Indeed, BJU has enjoyed impressive success, further extending its services to two satellite clinics in Beijing. With the opening of Shanghai United Family Hospital and Clinics in 2004, the city of Shanghai also gained access to the United Family Hospital's vision of international-standard healthcare in a uniquely warm, caring, and service-oriented environment. With demand growing—not only among expatriates but also among Chinese patients—plans are in the works for expansion into other major cities in China.

References

External links
 Official website
 BUPA listing, accessed 7 June 2013
 Beijinger Listing, accessed 16 July 2015
 City Weekend Listing, accessed 16 July 2015
 Time Out Beijing listing, accessed 7 June 2013
 Having a baby in China listing, accessed 7 June 2013

Hospital buildings completed in 1997
Hospitals in Beijing